Golf at the 2018 Summer Youth Olympics was held at the Hurlingham Club in Buenos Aires, Argentina from 9 to 15 October 2018.

Qualification
Each National Olympic Committee (NOC) can enter a team of 2 athletes of 1 male and 1 female. As hosts, Argentina was given a team to compete and a further 5 teams of 2 athletes was decided by the Tripartite Commission. The remaining 26 teams were decided by adding the ranking place of the top ranked eligible male and female golfers on the World Amateur Golf Rankings released on 25 July 2018. The 26 NOCs with the lowest combined rankings qualified.

To be eligible to participate at the Youth Olympics athletes must have been born between 1 January 2000 and 31 December 2003. Furthermore, all athletes must be amateur golfers who hold a recognised handicap index not exceeding 6.4.

Medal summary

Medal table

Events

References

External links
Official Results Book – Golf

 
2018 Summer Youth Olympics events
Youth Summer Olympics
2018
2018 Summer Youth Olympics